Comenzaré, released in 1998, is the debut album by Luis Fonsi. The album was certified Disco de Platino for selling 100,000 copies in the United States.

Track listing 
 "Si Tú Quisieras" – 4:25
 "Comenzaré" – 3:53
 "Perdóname" – 3:57
 "Tu Calor" – 3:53
 "Dime Cómo" – 3:42
 "Yo Frente Al Amor" – 3:15
 "Por Ella" – 3:40
 "Tres Veces No" – 3:26
 "Me Iré" – 3:37
 "Ya No Sé Querer" – 4:19

Charts

Sales and certifications

References 

1998 debut albums
Luis Fonsi albums